The Margaret River Pro 2017 is an event of the Association of Surfing Professionals for the 2017 World Surf League.

This event was held from 29 march to 9 April at Margaret River, (Western Australia, Australia) and contested by 18 surfers.

Round 1

Round 2

Round 3

Round 4

Quarter finals

Semi finals

Final

References

2017 World Surf League
Margaret River Pro
2017 in Australian women's sport
Sports competitions in Western Australia
Margaret River, Western Australia
Women's surfing